Atrusca is a genus of gall wasps in the family Cynipidae. It consists of approximately 50 species, and is found in North and Central America.

References

Cynipidae
Hymenoptera genera